The Zhubov scale is a way of reporting polar sea ice coverage, it was developed in the former USSR by Russian naval officer N. N. Zhubov (1895–1960).

The Zhubov scale is measured by using the unit ball, one ball equals 10% coverage, five balls 50% coverage and so on.

 

Sea ice